Dimitar Nikolov Petkov (2 November 1858, Tulcea – 11 March 1907, Sofia) was a leading member of the Bulgarian People's Liberal Party and the country's Prime Minister from 5 November 1906 until he was assassinated in Sofia the following year.

A veteran of the Russo-Turkish War of 1877-1878 he fought for the Russian Imperial Army at the Battle of Shipka Pass where he lost an arm during the combat.

Petkov spent five years (1888–1893) as mayor of Sofia and during his time in charge he undertook an extensive redevelopment of the city.

Following the death of Stefan Stambolov in 1895 he took over as leader of People's Liberal Party, a role he held until his own death when Nikola Genadiev succeeded him. Petkov's party took office in 1903 following the resignation of Stoyan Danev but Ferdinand I of Bulgaria chose a non-party Prime Minister, his close friend Racho Petrov, instead of Petkov. He was finally appointed Prime Minister in November 1906 but held the post for only a few months as he was murdered by an anarchist in Sofia's Boulevard Alexander II on 11 March 1907.

His son Nikola Petkov was also a politician in post-war Bulgaria before being put to death in 1947.

References

 

1856 births
1907 deaths
Chairpersons of the National Assembly of Bulgaria
People from Tulcea
Liberal Party (Bulgaria) politicians
People's Liberal Party politicians
Prime Ministers of Bulgaria
Members of the National Assembly (Bulgaria)
Mayors of Sofia
Bulgarian people of the Russo-Turkish War (1877–1878)
Recipients of the Cross of St. George
Assassinated Bulgarian politicians
People murdered in Bulgaria
Assassinated heads of government
20th-century Bulgarian politicians
19th-century Bulgarian politicians
Deaths by firearm in Bulgaria
Battle of Shipka Pass